Youssef Fayek (born 18 March 2000) is a Libyan footballer who currently plays for Olympic Azzaweya of the Libyan Premier League, and the Libya national team.

International career
Fayek made his senior international debut on 29 January 2022 in a friendly loss to Kuwait.

International career statistics

References

External links
National Football Teams profile

2000 births
Living people
Association football forwards
Libyan footballers
Libya international footballers
Al-Madina SC players
Libyan Premier League players